Klaus-Peter Foppke is a German rower who competed for the SC Dynamo Berlin / Sportvereinigung (SV) Dynamo. He won medals at international rowing competitions.

References 

Living people
Year of birth missing (living people)
German male rowers
World Rowing Championships medalists for East Germany
European Rowing Championships medalists